Ghislain Mukendi Kalobo (born 4 June 1985) is a Congolese former footballer who played as a midfielder.

References

1985 births
Living people
Footballers from Kinshasa
Democratic Republic of the Congo footballers
Democratic Republic of the Congo international footballers
Association football midfielders
Democratic Republic of the Congo expatriate footballers
Expatriate footballers in Angola
Democratic Republic of the Congo expatriate sportspeople in Angola
AS Vita Club players
Daring Club Motema Pembe players
AS New Soger players
Kabuscorp S.C.P. players
G.D. Sagrada Esperança players
21st-century Democratic Republic of the Congo people